Little Company of Mary Health Care, also known as Calvary Health Care is an arm of the Sisters of the Little Company of Mary in Australia.

It operates a number of health services throughout Australia, including public and Catholic private hospitals, aged care and retirement communities and a range of home care and community based services.

Public Hospitals

Australian Capital Territory
Calvary Public Hospital Bruce
New South Wales
Calvary Health Care Kogarah
Calvary Mater Newcastle
Victoria
Calvary Health Care Bethlehem

Private Hospitals

 Australian Capital Territory
Calvary Bruce Private Hospital
Calvary John James Hospital
 New South Wales
Calvary Riverina Hospital (Wagga Wagga)
South Australia
Calvary Adelaide Hospital – Adelaide (replaced the Calvary Wakefield Hospital in 2020)
Calvary Central Districts Hospital – Elizabeth Vale
Calvary North Adelaide Hospital – North Adelaide (operated by the Sisters from 1900)
with the associated Mary Potter Hospice
Calvary Rehabilitation Hospital – Walkerville
Tasmania
 Calvary Health Care Tasmania – Lenah Valley Campus – Lenah Valley
 Calvary Health Care Tasmania – St John's Campus – South Hobart (from 1940)
 Calvary Health Care Tasmania – St Luke's Campus – Launceston (from 1944)
 Calvary Health Care Tasmania – St Vincent's Campus – Launceston

Aged Care & Retirement Communities

 Adelaide
 Belmont
 Berri, South Australia
 Canberra
 Cessnock
 Cooks Hill
 Eleebana
 Hamilton
 Lambton
 Maitland
 Muswellbrook
 Ryde
 Sandgate
 Singleton
 Tanilba Bay
 Taree
 Waratah

Others
Home and community-based care service centres

References

External links 

Hospitals in Australia
Catholic hospitals in Oceania